The year 1939 in archaeology involved some significant events.

Excavations
 Major excavation of Ostia Antica in Italy begins (continues to 1942).
 University of Pennsylvania project at Piedras Negras, Guatemala ends (started 1931).
 Palace of Nestor in Pylos by Carl Blegen (resumed 1952-69).
 Tomb of Psusennes at Tanis by Pierre Montet (started 1928).
 Deserted medieval village of Seacourt near Oxford by Rupert Bruce-Mitford (June–July 15).
 Medieval settlement at Bere, North Tawton, England, by Martyn Jope.
 Bowl barrow at Knap Hill, Wiltshire, England, by C. W. Phillips.

Publications
Grahame Clark: Archaeology and Society.

Finds
May: Sutton Hoo ship burial unearthed by Basil Brown and Edith Pretty in Suffolk, England. On July 28 the Sutton Hoo helmet is excavated.
August 25: The Lion-man statue is discovered in the Hohlenstein-Stadel, a cave in southern Germany.
Matthew Stirling discovers the bottom half of Stela C at Tres Zapotes in Veracruz, Mexico.
Wyllys Andrews discovers the Maya civilization site of Kulubá in Yucatán, Mexico.

Miscellaneous
 May 6: Dorothy Garrod is elected to the Disney Professorship of Archaeology in the University of Cambridge, the first woman to hold an Oxbridge chair.

Births
 January 15: Neil Cossons, English industrial archaeologist and museum director
 July 12: Peter Addyman, English archaeologist
 November 6: Peter J. Reynolds, English experimental archaeologist (d. 2001)
 December 10: Barry Cunliffe, English archaeologist
 November 27: Malcolm Todd, English archaeologist (d. 2013)

Deaths
 March 2: Howard Carter, English Egyptologist (b. 1874)

References

Archaeology
Archaeology
Archaeology by year